The 1969 College Football All-America team is composed of college football players who were selected as All-Americans by various organizations that chose College Football All-America Teams in 1969.

The NCAA recognizes six selectors as "official" for the 1969 season.  They are (1) the American Football Coaches Association (AFCA), (2) the Associated Press (AP), (3) the Central Press Association (CP), (4) the Football Writers Association of America (FWAA), (5) the Newspaper Enterprise Association (NEA), and (6) the United Press International (UPI). Four of the six teams (AP, UPI, NEA, and FWAA) were selected by polling of sports writers and/or broadcasters. The Central Press team was selected with input from the captains of the major college teams.  The AFCA team was based on a poll of coaches.  Other notable selectors, though not recognized by the NCAA as official, included Football News, a national weekly football publication, Time magazine, The Sporting News (TSN), and the Walter Camp Football Foundation (WC).

Offensive selections

Ends 

 Walker Gillette, Richmond (AP-1 [wide receiver], FWAA, NEA-1 [split end], TSN, Time)
 Carlos Alvarez, Florida (College Football Hall of Fame) (AFCA [flanker], AP-3 [wide receiver], CP-2, NEA-1 [split end], UPI-1, FN, WC)
 Ken Burrough, Texas Southern (NEA-2, Time, TSN)
 Cotton Speyrer, Texas   (CP-1, UPI-2, WC)
 Chuck Dicus, Arkansas (College Football Hall of Fame) (AFCA)
 Elmo Wright, Houston  (AP-2 [wide receiver], CP-3, NEA-2 [split end], UPI-2, FN)
 Ernie Jennings, Air Force (CP-2)
 Jade Butcher, Indiana (CP-3)

Tight ends 

 Jim Mandich, Michigan (College Football Hall of Fame) (AFCA [end], AP-1, CP-1 [end], FWAA, NEA-1, UPI-1 [end], FN [end], Time, WC)
 Steve Zabel, Oklahoma (TSN)
 Jim McFarland, Nebraska (AP-2)
 Ray Parson, Minnesota (NEA-2)
 Bob Moore, Stanford (AP-3)

Tackles 

 Bob McKay, Texas  (AP-1, CP-2, FWAA, NEA-1, UPI-1, FN, Time, TSN, WC)
 John Ward, Oklahoma State (AFCA [guard], AP-1, FWAA, UPI-2)
 Sid Smith, USC  (AP-2, CP-1, NEA-2, UPI-1, FN, Time, TSN, WC)
 Bob Asher, Vanderbilt (AP-2, CP-1, NEA-1, UPI-2)
 Bobby Wuensch, Texas (AFCA)
 Jim Reilly, Notre Dame (AFCA, AP-3, NEA-2)
 Dan Dierdorf, Michigan (College and Pro Football Halls of Fame) (CP-2)
 Larron Jackson, Missouri (AP-3)
 Bob Bouley, Boston College (CP-3)
 Manny Rodriguez, New Mexico State (CP-3)

Guards 

 Bill Bridges, Houston (AFCA, AP-1, FWAA, NEA-2, UPI-2)
 Chip Kell, Tennessee (College Football Hall of Fame) (AFCA [center], AP-1, CP-1, FWAA, UPI-1, FN, WC)
 Ron Saul, Michigan State (AP-3, CP-1, NEA-1, Time, TSN)
 Larry DiNardo, Notre Dame  (CP-2, UPI-1, WC)
 Mike Carroll, Missouri (NEA-1, TSN)
 Chuck Hutchison, Ohio State (Time)
 Alvin Samples, Alabama (AP-2, CP-2, UPI-2, FN)
 Steve Greer, Georgia (FN)
 Jerry Dossey, Arkansas (AP-2)
 Ed Chapupka, North Carolina (AP-3)
 Doug Redmann, Illinois (CP-3, NEA-2)
 Jon Meskimen, Iowa (CP-3)

Centers 

 Rodney Brand, Arkansas  (AP-1, CP-1, FWAA, NEA-1, UPI-1, FN, WC)
 Ken Mendenhall, Oklahoma (CP-2, UPI-2, FN, Time, TSN)
 Dale Evans, Kansas (AP-2)
 Dennis Bramlett, UTEP (NEA-2)
 Tom Banks, Auburn (AP-3)
 Jack Kovar, Texas A&M (CP-3)

Quarterbacks 

 Mike Phipps, Purdue (College Football Hall of Fame) (AFCA, AP-1, CP-1, FWAA, NEA-1, UPI-1, FN, Time, TSN, WC)
 Archie Manning, Mississippi (College Football Hall of Fame) (AP-3, CP-2, UPI-2, FN)
 Jim Plunkett, Stanford (College Football Hall of Fame) (AP-2, CP-3)

Running backs 

 Steve Owens, Oklahoma (College Football Hall of Fame) (AFCA [halfback], AP-1 [halfback], CP-1, FWAA, NEA-1, UPI-1, FN [halfback], Time, TSN, WC)
 Jim Otis, Ohio State  (AP-1 [fullback], CP-1 [fullback], FWAA, UPI-1, FN [fullback], WC)
 Bobby Anderson, Colorado (College Football Hall of Fame) (AP-1 [halfback], NEA-1, UPI-1, TSN)
 Charlie Pittman, Penn State (AFCA [halfback], CP-3, UPI-2, Time)
 Steve Worster, Texas (AP-2 [fullback], CP-2 [fullback], FWAA, UPI-2, FN [fullback])
 Warren Muir, South Carolina (AP-3 [fullback], AFCA [fullback])
 Rex Kern, Ohio State (College Football Hall of Fame) (CP-1, FN [qb], NEA-2 [qb])
 John Isenbarger, Indiana (AP-2 [halfback], CP-2, FN [halfback])
 Mickey Cureton, UCLA (FN [halfback])
 Mack Herron, Kansas State (CP-2, FN [halfback])
 Jim Strong, Houston (AP-2)
 Art Malone, Arizona State (NEA-2)
 Greg Jones, UCLA (NEA-2)
 Jim Bertelsen, Texas (AP-3 [halfback])
 Ed Marinaro, Cornell (AP-3 [halfback])
 Clarence Davis, USC (CP-3, UPI-2)
 Jim Braxton, West Virginia (CP-3 [fullback])

Defensive selections

Defensive ends 

 Jimmy Gunn, USC  (AFCA, AP-1, CP-1, FWAA, NEA-2, UPI-1, FN [end], WC)
 Phil Olsen, Utah State  (AP-1, NEA-1, UPI-1, Time, TSN, WC)
 Al Cowlings, USC (AP-2 [defensive tackle], NEA-1, FN [guard], Time, TSN)
 Floyd Reese, UCLA (AFCA, AP-2 [defensive tackle])
 Bill Brundige, Colorado (AP-2, CP-3, FWAA, UPI-2)
 Dick Campbell, Texas Tech (CP-1, NEA-2)
 Bill Atessis, Texas (AP-2)
 Michael Berrera, Kansas State (CP-2)
 Mark Debvec, Ohio State (CP-2)
 David Campbell, Auburn (UPI-2)
 Irby Augustine, California (AP-3)
 Jeff Slipp, Brigham Young (AP-3)
 Hap Farber, Mississippi (CP-3)

Defensive tackles 

 Mike Reid, Penn State (College Football Hall of Fame) (AFCA, AP-1, CP-1, FWAA, NEA-1, UPI-1, FN [tackle], Time, TSN, WC)
 Mike McCoy, Notre Dame  (AFCA, AP-1, CP-1, FWAA, NEA-1, UPI-1, FN [tackle], Time, TSN, WC)
 Steve Smear, Penn State (CP-2, UPI-2)
 Rock Perdoni, Georgia Tech (AP-3, CP-2)
 John Little, Oklahoma State (NEA-2)
 Wes Grant, UCLA (NEA-2)
 Leo Brooks, Texas (UPI-2)
 Lynn Duncan, Wichita State (AP-3)
 Paul Schmidlin, Ohio State (CP-3)
 Larry Nels, Wyoming (CP-3)

Middle guard 

 Jim Stillwagon, Ohio State (College Football Hall of Fame) (AFCA, AP-1, CP-1, NEA-1, UPI-1, FN [guard], WC)
 Carl Crennel, West Virginia (AP-2, CP-3, NEA-2, UPI-2)
 Steve Greer, Georgia (AP-3, CP-2)

Linebackers 

 Steve Kiner, Tennessee (College Football Hall of Fame) (AFCA, AP-1, CP-1, FWAA, NEA-1, UPI-1, FN, Time, TSN, WC)
 Dennis Onkotz, Penn State (College Football Hall of Fame) (AP-1, CP-3, FWAA, UPI-1, FN, WC)
 Mike Ballou, UCLA (AFCA, AP-3, CP-1, FWAA, NEA-2, UPI-2, FN, WC)
 Don Parish, Stanford (AP-1, UPI-2, Time, TSN)
 John Small, The Citadel (AP-2, NEA-1, Time, TSN)
 George Bevan, LSU (AFCA, AP-2, CP-2, FWAA, NEA-2)
 Cliff Powell, Arkansas (AFCA, AP-3)
 Glen Halsell, Texas (CP-1, FN)
 Jim Corrigall, Kent State (College Football Hall of Fame) (AP-3, NEA-1)
 Jack Reynolds, Tennessee (CP-3, FN)
 Bob Olson, Notre Dame (AP-2, CP-2)
 Mike Kolen, Auburn (CP-2, NEA-2)
 Ralph Cindrich, Pittsburgh (CP-3)

Defensive backs 

 Jack Tatum, Ohio State (College Football Hall of Fame) (AFCA, AP-1, CP-1, FWAA, NEA-1 [cornerback], UPI-1, FN, TSN, WC)
 Buddy McClinton, Auburn  (AFCA, AP-1, CP-1, FWAA, UPI-1, FN, WC)
 Tom Curtis, Michigan (College Football Hall of Fame) (AP-1, CP-1, NEA-2 [safety], UPI-1, FN, WC)
 Glenn Cannon, Mississippi (AFCA, AP-3, UPI-2, Time, TSN)
 Neal Smith, Penn State (AP-3, NEA-1 [safety], UPI-1)
 Steve Tannen, Florida (UPI-2, Time, TSN)
 Ted Provost, Ohio State (UPI-2, Time, TSN)
 Tim Foley, Purdue, (CP-3, NEA-2 [cornerback], Time)
 Curtis Johnson, Toledo (AP-2, CP-3, NEA-1 [cornerback])
 Denton Fox, Texas Tech (AP-2, FWAA)
 Tommy Casanova, LSU (College Football Hall of Fame) (FN)
 Dana Stephenson, Nebraska (AP-2, CP-2)
 Mel Easley, Oregon State (CP-2)
 Mike Sensibaugh, Ohio State (CP-2)
 Bruce Taylor, Boston University (NEA-2 [cornerback])
 David Berrong, Memphis State (AP-3, CP-3)

Special teams

Kicker 

 Bob Jacobs, Wyoming (FWAA, TSN)

Punter 

 Zenon Andrusyshyn, UCLA (TSN)

Key 
 Bold – Consensus All-American
 -1 – First-team selection
 -2 – Second-team selection
 -3 – Third-team selection

Official selectors
 AFCA = American Football Coaches Association picked for Kodak
 AP = Associated Press
 CP = Central Press Association, "picked with the help of the captains of the major college elevens"
 FWAA = Football Writers Association of America
 NEA = Newspaper Enterprise Association
 UPI = United Press International

Unofficial selectors
 FN = The Football News, consisting of the 33 best college football players as selected by the staff and correspondents of The Football News
 Time = Time magazine
 TSN = The Sporting News
 WC = Walter Camp Football Foundation

See also
 1969 All-Atlantic Coast Conference football team
 1969 All-Big Eight Conference football team
 1969 All-Big Ten Conference football team
 1969 All-Pacific-8 Conference football team
 1969 All-SEC football team
 1969 All-Southwest Conference football team

References

All-America Team
College Football All-America Teams